List of University of New Mexico alumni of the University of New Mexico in Albuquerque, New Mexico.

Alumni

Luis Fernando González Hoenig (born 1995), baseball outfielder for the San Francisco Giants

References

External links
 University of New Mexico
 UNM Alumni

University of New Mexico